Ksenia Lykina and Maša Zec Peškirič were the defending champions, having won the event in 2010, but both players chose not to participate in 2011.

Petra Cetkovská and Michaëlla Krajicek won the tournament, defeating Lindsay Lee-Waters and Megan Moulton-Levy in the final, 6–2, 6–1.

Seeds

Draw

References 
 Draw

Sparta Prague Open - Doubles
2011 Doubles